Lubawa County was once a county in what is now Warmian-Masurian Voivodeship, Poland, with its capital in Lubawa.

Geography of Warmian-Masurian Voivodeship